Carroll Wayne Harris (May 4, 1938 – June 4, 2015) was an American professional football player who was a linebacker for the Calgary Stampeders of the Canadian Football League (CFL) from 1961 through 1972. His son, Wayne Harris, Jr., coaches football and also  played for the Stampeders of the CFL.

High school and college
Harris was a high school all-American for the El Dorado, Arkansas High School Wildcats and played collegiately for University of Arkansas Razorbacks from 1957 to 1960. In 1960, he was selected as the outstanding player in the Southwest Conference and played in the Cotton Bowl Classic and the All-American Bowl.  He was nicknamed "Thumper".

CFL

Harris was drafted by the Boston Patriots of the American Football League, but opted to play in Canadian Football League for 12 years, all with the Calgary Stampeders. He won the Outstanding Lineman Award a record 4 times.  He was named all-Western Conference 11 times and all-Canadian 9 times, appearing in 3 Grey Cup finals: the 56th Grey Cup of 1968, the 58th Grey Cup of 1970, and the 59th Grey Cup of 1971, the latter being the only victory, when he was named Most Outstanding Player in the game. His jersey #55 was retired by the Stampeders in 1973.

Awards & Legacy
Harris has been inducted into the Canadian Football Hall of Fame, the College Football Hall of Fame (2004), the Arkansas Sports Hall of Fame, Arkansas' all-century team for the 20th century, and the Alberta Sports Hall of Fame. In November 2006, Harris was voted 9th among the CFL's Top 50 players of the league's modern era by Canadian sports network The Sports Network/TSN, no linebacker being ahead of him.

In 2012 in honour of the 100th Grey Cup, Canada Post used his image on a series of commemorative postage stamps. The image was also used on presentation posters and other materials to promote the Grey Cup game and other celebrations associated with the centennial.

Later life and death
Wayne worked for CanTex drilling as vice president and general manager of operation and served on the CAODC.
He died June 4, 2015, at the age of 77.

Further reading

Videos
Canadian Football Hall of Fame member

References

1938 births
2015 deaths
Arkansas Razorbacks football players
American players of Canadian football
Calgary Stampeders players
Canadian Football Hall of Fame inductees
Canadian football linebackers
College Football Hall of Fame inductees
People from Hampton, Arkansas
Players of American football from Arkansas